Deerfield Colony is a Hutterite colony and census-designated place (CDP) in Edmunds County, South Dakota, United States. It was first listed as a CDP prior to the 2020 census. The population of the CDP was 128 at the 2020 census.

It is in the northeast part of the county, bordered to the north by McPherson County.

Demographics

References 

Census-designated places in Edmunds County, South Dakota
Census-designated places in South Dakota
Hutterite communities in the United States